Rukometni klub Metković – Mehanika is a men's professional handball club from Metković, Croatia. It is the only club to win a domestic title and the Croatian Cup, except RK Zagreb. Due to economic difficulties the club has not competed in Croatian Handball Premier League between 2010 and 2022. 

The first club was founded on 26 September 1963 under the name Mehanika. RK Metković has changed its name several times since his foundation, so it played under the names of Razvitak, Metković Jambo, and another team Metković 1963 until reunification. 

Today, this club has men's and women's section.

Accomplishments
In 2000–01 season of the Croatian League, Metković and RK Zagreb tied for first place but RK Zagreb had home advantage in the finals which were not completed. Metković finished first in 2001–02 season of the Croatian League but because of a player whose transfer from RK Zagreb to Metković was not completed (it was still a case in arbitration; he played for them in a friendly match under a different name) they were moved to second place. 

Croatian League: 
Runners-up (7): 1998–99, 1999–2000, 2000–01,* 2001–02,* 2002–03, 2003–04, 2004–05
Croatian Cup: 
Winners (2): 2000–01, 2001–02
EHF Cup: 
Winners (1): 1999–2000
Runners-up (1): 2000–01

* – controversial championship

Notable former players 

 
 Patrik Ćavar
 Blaženko Lacković
 Petar Metličić
 Ivano Balić
 Nikša Kaleb
 Davor Dominiković
 Rolando Pušnik
 Valter Matošević
 Nenad Kljaić
 Mario Kelentrić
 Vladimir Jelčić
 Marko Kopljar
 Igor Karačić
 Željko Babić
| valign=top |
 Ivan Čupić
 Renato Sulić
 Ivica Obrvan
 Goran Jerković
 Mario Bjeliš
 Gyorgy Zsigmund
 Dragan Jerković
 Dario Jagić
 Zdravko Medić
 Siniša Markota
 Mario Perčin
 Renato Sršen
 Ivan Markovski
 Ivan Vukas
| valign=top |
 Mate Šunjić
 Luka Raković
 Sandro Uvodić
 Zvonimir Kapular
 Stanko Sabljić
 Nikola Govorko
 Ljubomir Rezić
 Slobodan Batinović
 Vlaho Lovrić
 Tomislav Dragun
 Branko Milivojević
 Luka Veraja
 Pero Veraja
 Tomislav Veraja
| valign=top |
 Jurica Volarević
 Zdravko Vučićević
 Tomo Dragović
 Ivica Zubac
 Joško Jukić
/ Mate Volarević

Famous coaches 
Slavko Goluža
Zvonimir Serdarušić
Ilija Puljević
Ivica Obrvan
Mojmir Majić
Jerko Alujević
Željko Babić
Emir Junuzović

References

External links
Official website of RK Metković (archived)

Croatian handball clubs
Sport in Metković